The Greek Women's Basketball Cup is the national women's basketball cup competition of Greece. It began with the 1995–96 season, and it is organised by the Hellenic Basketball Federation (EOK). So far, eleven clubs have won the cup. Most of them are based in the Athens Urban Area. Olympiacos Piraeus is based in Piraeus Urban Area and Apollon Kalamarias is based in Kalamaria, in the Thessaloniki Urban Area.

History
Sporting won the first ever cup competition, and Olympiacos Piraeus have won the last five cup competitions. Olympiacos Piraeus have won the most cups (5), followed by Esperides Kallitheas having won four.

Finals

Performance by club

References

External links
Hellenic basketball Federation 
Cup winners up to 2022 www.sport24 

Women's basketball competitions in Greece
Women's basketball cup competitions in Europe
1995 establishments in Greece